Johnathan Landus Motley (born May 4, 1995) is an American professional basketball player for Fenerbahçe of the Turkish Basketbol Süper Ligi and the EuroLeague. He played college basketball for the Baylor Bears, where he was a consensus second-team All-American as a junior.

High school career
Motley played high school basketball at North Shore High School in Houston, Texas under head coach David Green. He led his team to a 32–4 mark as a junior and a 30–5 mark in as a senior, winning back to back district championships. A top 100 recruit nationally, Motley committed to play at Baylor on September 12, 2012.

College career
Motley blossomed into an All-American player as a junior for Baylor, leading the Bears to their first number one ranking as a program during the 2016–17 season. At the close of the season, Motley was named the winner of the Karl Malone Award as the country's best college power forward.

At the close of his junior season, Motley declared his eligibility for the 2017 NBA draft but did not hire an agent, leaving open the option to return to college. He would later hire an agent before signing up for the 2017 NBA Draft Combine, thus ending any chances of returning for his senior year at Baylor.

Professional career

Dallas Mavericks (2017–2018)
After going undrafted in 2017 NBA draft, Motley signed a two-way contract with the Dallas Mavericks. He became the first player in franchise history to sign such a deal. As a result, he got to split his time playing between the Mavericks and their G League affiliate, the Texas Legends. After recovering from a previous injury he had, Motley would make his official NBA debut on December 14, 2017, recording 4 points in two minutes under a 112–97 loss to the defending champion Golden State Warriors. On April 4, 2018, he scored a career high 26 points in a 106–113 loss to the Detroit Pistons.

Los Angeles Clippers (2018–2020)
On July 23, 2018, Motley, along with the draft rights to Renaldas Seibutis, was traded to the Los Angeles Clippers in exchange for the draft rights to Maarty Leunen and cash considerations. He would be the league's first ever two-way contract to be traded to another team. Motley would become an unrestricted free agent on June 28, 2019 but the Clippers eventually re-signed him on July 25, 2019.

On November 30, 2020, Motley signed a training camp deal with the Phoenix Suns, but was waived on December 19.

Incheon ET Land Elephants (2021)
On February 28, 2021, Motley signed with Incheon ET Land Elephants of the Korean Basketball League where he averaged 20.7 points, 8.9 rebounds, 3.3 assists and 1.4 blocks.

Lokomotiv Kuban (2021–2022)
On August 3, 2021, Motley signed with Lokomotiv Kuban of the VTB United League and the 7DAYS EuroCup. He left the team after the 2022 Russian invasion of Ukraine.

Fenerbahçe Beko (2022–present)
On June 20, 2022, Motley signed with Fenerbahçe Beko of the Turkish Basketball Super League (BSL), his first EuroLeague club. He awarded EuroLeague MVP of the Round 19 with 22 points and 17 rebounds of 38 PIR.

Career statistics

NBA

Regular season

|-
| style="text-align:left;"| 
| style="text-align:left;"| Dallas
| 11 || 4 || 16.0 || .533 || .167 || .536 || 4.5 || .6 || .3 || .2 || 8.7
|-
| style="text-align:left;"| 
| style="text-align:left;"| L.A. Clippers
| 22 || 0 || 7.1 || .534 || .000 || .600 || 2.3 || .5 || .2 || .1 || 4.6
|-
| style="text-align:left;"| 
| style="text-align:left;"| L.A. Clippers
| 13 || 0 || 3.2 || .733 || 1.000 || .714 || .8 || .6 || .2 || .0 || 2.2
|- class="sortbottom"
| style="text-align:center;" colspan="2"| Career
| 46 || 4 || 8.1 || .552 || .200 || .587 || 2.4 || .6 || .2 || .1 || 4.9

References

External links

Baylor Bears bio

1995 births
Living people
Agua Caliente Clippers players
All-American college men's basketball players
American men's basketball players
American expatriate basketball people in South Korea
American expatriate basketball people in Russia
American expatriate basketball people in Turkey
Basketball players from Houston
Baylor Bears men's basketball players
Dallas Mavericks players
Fenerbahçe men's basketball players
Los Angeles Clippers players
North Shore Senior High School (Texas) alumni
PBC Lokomotiv-Kuban players
Power forwards (basketball)
Texas Legends players
Undrafted National Basketball Association players